The National Audiovisual Council (Romanian: Consiliul Național al Audiovizualului, CNA) is the official regulatory agency for the audio-visual market (radio, television) in Romania.

Television broadcasts and cable television, frequency allocations, content monitoring and license allocation are done by the CNA, that is the main regulatory authority for the broadcast media in Romania. The appointments to its board are politicised, and the body thus often acts in a biased and ineffective way.

TV warning signs and previsions 
AP (Parental Guidance) This program can be watched by children up to age of 12 only with the consent or with their parents or family.

12 - This program is prohibited for children under 12 years of age (Art. 23 (1) Audiovisual productions forbidden to children under 12 years of age shall be broadcast only after 20:00 and shall be permanently accompanied by a warning sign representing a white circle, and inside it, on a transparent background, the number 12 White color)

15 - This program is forbidden to children under 15 years of age (Article 24 1. Audiovisual productions forbidden to children under 15 years of age shall be broadcast only between 23:00 and 06:00 and shall be permanently accompanied by a warning sign representing a white circle, and inside it, on a transparent background, white number 15; except for feature films, series and documentaries classified 15, in which case the time allowed is 22:00 and 06:00)

18 - This program is forbidden to children under 18 years of age (Article 24 1. Audiovisual productions forbidden to children under the age of 18 shall be broadcast only between 01:00 and 06:00 and shall be permanently accompanied by a warning sign representing a white circle, and inside it, on a transparent background, white number 18)

Art. 39 (2) of the Audiovisual Code: According to the provisions invoked, the broadcasting on television and broadcasting services of programs which may affect the physical, mental or moral development of minors can be done only if, by choosing the time slot, by coding or as a result of other conditional access systems, ensure that minors in the transmission area, in normal situations, cannot hear or see those broadcasts.

Article 40 (3) of the Audiovisual Code: "Moderators, presenters and producers of programs have an obligation not to use or allow guests to use abusive language or incite violence against other people."

Art. 18 of the Audiovisual Code: According to the previsions invoked, it cannot be broadcast in the time slot 06:00 to 23:00, productions featuring scenes of mental language violence repeteadly or a high degree of intensity and severity or those that present sex scenes, trivial language or behavior, vulgar or obscene.

Art. 101 (3) of the Audiovisual Code: Content show that offer cash prizes or in stuff, they can be broadcast only live and in the time slot 22:00 to 06:00.

See also 
 Media of Romania
 Federal Communications Commission

References

External links 

Regulatory agencies of Romania
Communications authorities
1992 establishments in Romania
Government agencies established in 1992
Independent government agencies of Romania